The Annenberg Public Policy Center (APPC) is a center for the study of public policy at the Annenberg School for Communication at the University of Pennsylvania. It has offices in Washington, D.C. and Philadelphia, where the University of Pennsylvania is located.

Activities
The Annenberg Center is a political advocacy group that owns FactCheck.org. The Annenberg Center conducts research, convenes panels of experts, hosts lectures and conferences, and publishes reports on five main areas: Political communication, information and society, media and children, health communication, and adolescent risk.

The APPC was established in 1993 by Walter and Leonore Annenberg and its ongoing funding comes from an endowment established for it at that time by the Annenberg Foundation. In 2009, it had a staff of 54 people. Architect Fumihiko Maki designed the Center's facilities.

References

External links
 

1993 establishments in Pennsylvania
Annenberg School for Communication at the University of Pennsylvania
Educational institutions established in 1993
Fumihiko Maki buildings
University of Pennsylvania